{| class="infobox" style="font-size: 88%; width: 22em; text-align: center"
! colspan=3 style="font-size: 125%; background-color:#FF0000; color:white; text-align:center;"|
Active departments ofPersija Jakarta
|- style="text-align: center"
|Football (Men's)|Football (Women's)|Football U-20 (Men's)
|- style="font-size: 90%; text-align: center"
|Football U-18 (Men's)
|Football U-16 (Men's)
|Esports
|}

Persija Putri (English: Persija Women's''), is an Indonesia professional Women's football club based in Jakarta, Indonesia. Founded in 2019, the club is affiliated with men's professional association football club Persija Jakarta. It currently plays in the Liga 1 Putri, the top women's league in Indonesia.

History
In July 2019, Persija Jakarta announced their commitment to take part in the inaugural season of Liga 1 Putri, a women's football competition in Indonesia and formed a women's football team.

Players

Current squad

References

External links
 

Association football clubs established in 2019
 
Women's football clubs in Indonesia